Brendan Keeshan (22 July 1957) is an Irish retired hurler who played as a right wing-back for the Offaly senior team.

Born in Shinrone, County Offaly, Keeshan first played competitive hurling in his youth. He made his senior debut with Offaly during the 1976-77 National League and immediately became a regular member of the team. During his career Keeshan won two All-Ireland medals and three Leinster medals.

Keeshan was a member of the Leinster inter-provincial team on a number of occasions, however, he never won a Railway Cup medal. At club level he played with Shinrone.

His retirement came following the conclusion of the 1988 championship.

Honours

Team

Offaly
All-Ireland Senior Hurling Championship (2): 1981, 1985
Leinster Senior Hurling Championship (5): 1980, 1984, 1988

References

1957 births
Living people
Offaly inter-county hurlers
Leinster inter-provincial hurlers
All-Ireland Senior Hurling Championship winners
Shinrone hurlers